Mike Leveille (born December 25, 1985) is a former professional lacrosse player with the Chicago Machine of Major League Lacrosse.  He was an All-American at Syracuse University, and was awarded the Tewaaraton Trophy in 2008.

Professional career
Leveille was drafted in the 2008 Major League Lacrosse Collegiate draft by the New Jersey Pride, and was to the Chicago Machine hours later. His brother Kevin Leveille is also a member of the Chicago Machine.

Leveille made an immediate impact, winning Rookie of the Week honors in first week in the league.  He scored two goals and assisted on two goals by his brother Kevin against the Washington Bayhawks.

On May 17, 2014, both Mike and his brother Kevin were inducted into the Albany Academy High School Hall of Fame for their skills, prowess, and endless charitable contributions.

Awards

Statistics

Syracuse University

MLL

References

1985 births
Living people
American lacrosse players
Major League Lacrosse players
People from Bethlehem, New York
Sportspeople from New York (state)
Syracuse Orange men's lacrosse players